Kizhayoor is a beautiful village near Pattambi in Pattambi Taluk, Palghat District of Kerala, India, alongside the Bharathappuzha river.

References

Villages in Palakkad district